Justyna Banasiak (born 2 May 1986 in Szczecin) is a Polish group rhythmic gymnast. She represents her nation at international competitions. 

She participated at the 2004 Summer Olympics in the group all-around event together with Alexandra Wójcik, Martyna Dąbkowska, Małgorzata Ławrynowicz, Anna Mrozińska and Aleksandra Zawistowska finishing 10th. She competed at world championships, including at the 2005 World Rhythmic Gymnastics Championships.

References

External links
BBC
gymmedia.com
todor66.com
sport.pl

1986 births
Living people
Polish rhythmic gymnasts
Sportspeople from Szczecin
Gymnasts at the 2004 Summer Olympics
Olympic gymnasts of Poland